Académicos de Atlas was a reserve team of Atlas, in 2005-06 season known as Coyotes de Sonora.

History
In 2004–05 Segunda División de México season, Académicos won the opening and closing champion of group Liguilla de Ascenso and promoted to Ascenso MX.

The club was renamed to Coyotes and re-located to Hermosillo, Sonora, but remained as part of Atlas. After a season, the club changed the name back to Académicos.

In 2007-08 season, the club was based in Tonalá, Jalisco and in 2008-09 season, in Guadalajara. After the reconstruction of Primera División A, the team folded, but Atlas still had teams played from the 7th division to 2nd division.

Current squad

Honours
 Segunda División de México: 2
Apertura 2004, Clausura 2005

 Tercera División de México: 2
1997–98, Apertura 2001

References

External links
 :: ATLAS :: Sitio Oficial

Defunct football clubs in Jalisco
Defunct football clubs in Mexico
Association football clubs disestablished in 2009
Atlas F.C.
Mexican reserve football clubs
2009 disestablishments in Mexico
Zapopan